Salvia cinica is a perennial plant that is native to the hills of Anhui and Zhejiang provinces in China. Inflorescences are 5–12 flowered verticillasters in terminal racemes, with a corolla that is tawny, purplish or purple on the upper lip, .

Notes

cinica
Flora of Zhejiang